The 2019–20 season was the 140th season of competitive association football in England.

The season was suspended 13 March 2020 due to the ongoing COVID-19 pandemic, the first time that an entire football season was suspended since the 1939-40 season was abandoned due to the onset of World War II. On 26 March, the season was abandoned in divisions below the National League, with all results being expunged, one relegation and one expulsion taking place.

The Premier League resumed on 17 June and the Championship on 20 June with all matches played behind closed doors.

National teams

England national football team

Kits

Results and fixtures

Friendlies

UEFA Euro 2020 qualifying

Group A

England U-21 national football team

England U-19 national football team

England women's national football team

Results and fixtures

Friendlies

2019 FIFA Women's World Cup

Group D

Knockout stage

2020 SheBelieves Cup

FIFA competitions

2019 FIFA Club World Cup

Semi-finals

Final

UEFA competitions

UEFA Champions League

Group stage

Group B

Group C

Group E

Group H

Knockout phase

Round of 16 

|}

Quarter-finals

|}

UEFA Europa League

Second qualifying round 

|}

Third qualifying round 

|}

Play-off round

|}

Group stage

Group F

Group K

Group L

Knockout phase

Round of 32

|}

Round of 16

|}

Quarter-finals

|}

Semi-finals

|}

UEFA Super Cup

This was the first Super Cup to feature two English teams.

UEFA Youth League

UEFA Champions League Path

Group B

Group C

Group E

Group H

Domestic Champions Path

First round

|}

Second round

|}

Play-offs

|}

Knockout phase

Round of 16

|}

UEFA Women's Champions League

Knockout phase

Round of 32

Notes

Round of 16

Quarter-finals

|}

Men's football

Premier League
Amid uncertainty and calls for the season to be rendered null and void in the midst of the pandemic, the FA voted for both the Premier League and the Championship to finish their respective campaigns – a decision that finally helped Liverpool, after decades of heart-break, near-misses and rebuilding, to end their long wait and win their first league title since 1990, as well as breaking the record for the earliest top-flight win in history, whilst also extending their unbeaten league run at Anfield to a third successive season and 59 games – despite a succession of dropped points in their remaining games ensured they'd miss out on breaking any of the previously set title-winning records on top of an early exit in the Champions League knockout stage, the Reds won both the UEFA Super Cup and the Club World Cup in the first half of the season to mark one of their most successful campaigns since 2001. Finishing second were Manchester City, who had been widely tipped to build on their domestic treble the previous season – however, they endured arguably one of the most disappointing title defences in the club's history, losing ground on Liverpool as early as their second game and suffering a number of unexpected and poor defeats, including home-and-away to both Wolverhampton Wanderers and city rivals Manchester United, a decision ultimately put down to the club's failure to replace departing captain Vincent Kompany and then losing key players Leroy Sane and Aymeric Laporte to long-term injuries; despite this, City were at least able to earn silverware, winning their fifth League Cup in seven seasons.

In similar circumstances to the previous season, the battle for the remaining top-four spots went down to the final day – and saw Chelsea and Manchester United scrape through at the expense of Leicester City; Chelsea's first season under new head coach and former player Frank Lampard proved largely indifferent, conceding far more goals than all of the top ten, but they managed enough consistency to ensure Champions League football, whilst a largely underwhelming 2020 went against Leicester, who lost a winner-takes-all final day game against United, the Red Devils securing Champions League football despite an inconsistent 2019 – the arrival of midfielder Bruno Fernandes in the winter transfer window helping to reinvigorate the team. An uneven start to the season for Tottenham Hotspur ultimately saw manager Mauricio Pochettino sacked after five and a half years at the helm; whilst the installation of Jose Mourinho helped push the club back up the table and into a late battle to ensure Europa League football for the next campaign, an early exit in the Champions League and poor performances across domestic cup competitions put paid to any hopes of Spurs winning a trophy – with similar performances in the league raising questions about Mourinho's long-term tactics.

Having been tipped to struggle in their first top-flight season since 2007, Sheffield United defied all their critics by recording both a top-ten finish and conceding fewer goals than much of the top half, even staying in the fight for a European spot up until the final game, an effort that gave the Blades and manager Chris Wilder deserved praise. Arsenal endured one of their worst seasons since the inception of the Premier League, with a succession of draws and winless runs across all competitions in the first half of the season extinguishing the Gunners' hopes of winning the league title and costing manager Unai Emery his job; whilst the season's second half proved to be much better under former player and new manager Mikel Arteta, including winning the FA Cup for the fourth time in seven seasons and ensuring Europa League football next season, further dropped points either side of the suspension ensured the London club would only just scrap into the top eight. Southampton endured yet another underwhelming start to the season, including suffering the worst home defeat in the history of the top-flight in late October at the hands of Leicester City – however, strong away form from that point onwards helped pushed the Saints comfortably clear of the drop, with safety ensured following an impressive home win over Manchester City.

At the bottom of the table, Norwich City endured a disastrous return to the Premier League, suffering relegation with three games to go in a torrid season that saw the Canaries hit with an extensive injury crisis and fail to really make much impact both in the transfer window and in the league itself, despite an astonishing victory against Manchester City at Carrow Road early in the campaign; having been bottom but still in with a shout of survival when the season was suspended, they were ultimately undone by losing every single match after the season resumed. The battle to avoid the remaining relegation places proved to be closer than expected, but both Aston Villa – defying the odds in their first season back in the top-flight – and West Ham United survived the drop, at the expense of Watford and Bournemouth, the Hornets ultimately being let down by both an atrocious start to the season with only a solitary win in their opening sixteen games and their sacking of three different managers, with Bournemouth also being let down by a collapse in points and form either side of the season being suspended despite a remarkable victory over Everton on the final day; coincidentally, all three clubs had been promoted in the same season only five years prior, albeit Norwich had gone straight back down the following year.

Championship 

The race for the automatic promotion spots proved competitive, both before the season was suspended and after the decision was made to resume following a vote by the FA. But in the end, Leeds United made up for their play-off semi-final disappointment the previous year and returned to the Premier League for the first time since 2004 in Marcelo Bielsa's second season as manager. The Yorkshire club remained in the promotion positions all season despite poor January form and  ensured both promotion and the champions' spot before their penultimate game. The battle for second place proved to be just as hotly contested with three teams in the mix in the last round of games, but West Bromwich Albion successfully held off strong runs of form from both Brentford and Fulham to end a two-year absence from the top-flight, giving Slaven Bilić promotion in his first season as head coach. Both London clubs therefore qualified for the play-offs, alongside Welsh clubs Cardiff City and Swansea City. The latter had somehow managed to leapfrog Nottingham Forest in the closing minutes of the season on goals scored - Forest being left to rue a six-game win-less run, having been all but guaranteed a top-six finish at the start of July. The playoffs were won by Fulham, making an immediate return to the Premier League while giving Scott Parker a successful first full season in management.

The battle for the play-offs ultimately proved a closer affair, with many teams battling for one spot; among the teams to miss out were Derby County, who overcame a sluggish start to only narrowly miss out on a play-off position, whilst also managing to sign top-flight legend Wayne Rooney in the winter transfer window. Amid yet another poor start to their season, Reading looked poised to endure a third successive relegation battle – however, the unorthodox decision of newly installed Sporting Director Mark Bowen to appoint himself as manager proved to be a successful one as the Royals rocketed away from the bottom and even looked likely to snatch an unlikely play-off position in the closing weeks of the campaign, falling short in the closing games. Newly relegated Huddersfield Town suffered a similarly dreadful start to their campaign and found themselves battling a second consecutive relegation in a row, but the appointment of Lincoln City manager Danny Cowley and several key wins picked up at crucial points ultimately proved enough for the Terriers to secure their Championship status, the win in their penultimate game that ensured safety ironically being the one to send Leeds back into the top-flight.

The battle at the bottom of the table ended up being one of the tightest in the history of the second tier, with all three relegation spots left wide open going into the last game – and in the end, it was ultimately Hull City, Wigan Athletic and Charlton Athletic who dropped into League One; Hull's relegation came after a complete collapse in form in the second half of the season, the accumulation of just eight points after New Year's Day and the sale of key players Kamil Grosicki and Jarred Bowen helping to condemn the Tigers to the third tier for the first time since 2005. Wigan controversially took the last spot, suffering a 12-point deduction for entering administration and falling into the bottom three after the final whistle as a result, despite an outstanding run of form after the season resumed that included an 8–0 win at home over Hull. Charlton Athletic suffered immediate relegation back to the third tier, the London club being left to rue a run of just one win between the middle of October and the end of January despite securing some positive results in their closing games.  Having been nearly adrift at the turn of the year, Luton Town saw a resurgence of their own that saw them fight their way to safety, the Hatters being helped by the return of influential manager Nathan Jones during the suspension, whilst Barnsley defied the odds and poor form in the first half of the season to secure their place in the second tier.

League One 
With the season postponed in March, clubs in both League One and League Two found enough votes to agree to end the season - using Points-Per-Game to help solidify a final points total, both Coventry City and Rotherham United were automatically promoted. the Sky Blues' promotion came just three years after relegation to League Two and eight years after having fallen out of the second tier, marking a remarkable turn of events for the club despite off-field issues that saw them being forced to ground-share with Birmingham City, whilst the Millers secured a second instant return to the Championship in two years (making this the fourth consecutive season that they moved between the Championship and League One), in spite of having fallen off the top of the table just prior to the season being suspended. The final qualifying spot was taken by Wycombe Wanderers, who stormed through the play-offs to record the Buckinghamshire club's first ever promotion to the Championship; whilst they had dropped off the top of the table over the festive period and then dropped further down, the Chairboys recovered enough before the season was postponed to ensure a third-place finish through Points-Ger-Game and give long-term manager Gareth Ainsworth his second promotion with the club in three seasons.

Losing out in the play-off final were Oxford United, who missed out on a chance to return to the second tier for the first time since the end of the 20th century; none-the-less, the U's enjoyed a fantastic season, which included making the quarter-finals of the League Cup and thrashing Premier League side West Ham 4–0 along the way. A poor start to the season ultimately cost Sunderland a second successive chance of promotion despite an improvement with new manager Phil Parkinson, whilst a superb start for Ipswich Town completely fell apart in the New Year, consigning the Tractor Boys to another season in the third tier; both clubs had advocated resuming the season. Lincoln City were another club who had started well, giving hope for a second promotion in a row, but a poor start under new management after the departure of Danny Cowley to Huddersfield Town saw results drop off, leaving them closer to relegation in the table - nevertheless, safety was secured by virtue of the season ending early, a decision that gave fellow promoted side Milton Keynes Dons a second season in League One.

Bury's season practically ended before it started, financial troubles ultimately seeing the club expelled from the Football League altogether, the first team to suffer this fate since Maidstone United in 1992. As a result, only three teams were relegated when the season concluded; Bolton Wanderers, Southend United and Tranmere Rovers. Bolton's relegation came amid similar finance issues to Bury, though they were able to find new ownership to avoid expulsion; however, their points deduction would have had no bearing on their battle to escape the drop, as terrible early-season form and a lack of wins helped consign the Trotters to a second consecutive relegation, meaning they would be playing in the fourth tier for the first time since 1988 next season. Southend United fared little better, only finishing above Bolton because of the points deduction and only avoiding conceding 100 goals because of the season finishing early, suffering relegation after five seasons in the third tier. Despite finding form in the early months of 2020, Tranmere could not escape the relegation zone before the season was suspended and suffered an immediate relegation back to League Two - though they did have some positives in their season, including managing to come from 3–0 down to hold Watford in the FA Cup at Vicarage Road and then beat them in the replay.

League Two 
As with League One, League Two also opted to end the season early following its postponement in March - this gave Swindon Town, Crewe Alexandra and Plymouth Argyle automatic promotion. Just three years after falling into the fourth tier, Swindon finally picked up enough points to return to League One, thanks in part to the impressive goal-scoring efforts of Irish forward Eoin Doyle. Crewe's promotion came four years after suffering relegation themselves and to the surprise of many, considering their previous campaigns had seen them either only avoid relegation or finish in mid-table; nevertheless, the Railwaymen enjoyed a good season before it had been postponed, managing to win promotion with the most goals scored. Having just missed out on avoiding the drop into League Two the previous season, Plymouth bounced back in style as they sealed an immediate return to the third tier, thanks in part to the experience of new manager Ryan Lowe who had helped expelled club Bury to promotion the previous year despite off-field problems. Taking the final spot via the play-offs were Northampton Town, who ended a two-year spell outside of the third tier in dramatic style; the Cobblers had actually lost five out of seven league games prior to the season being suspended, a run that nearly saw them fall out of the play-off places altogether, before losing their first play-off leg - however, the team rallied and processed to win both the second leg and then the final at Wembley by big scorelines, ending Keith Curle's first full season as manager in some style.

Exeter City endured another troubling attempt at promotion, having been largely in the top three for most of the season before falling into the play-offs before the suspension of the season; whilst they achieved a comeback result in the playoffs, their crushing loss at the hands of Northampton Town ensured a third play-off final loss in four seasons. Missing out on the play-offs as a result of the usage of Points-Per-Game were Bradford City despite looking like they'd bounce back from relegation the previous year, Forest Green Rovers who were looking to build on having made the play-off semi-finals the previous year and even Salford City, who defied all their critics and took to their first season in the Football League very well. Following the unexpected and tragic death of manager Justin Edinburgh weeks after they had been promoted, a poor run of results at several points in the early months of the season saw Leyton Orient likely to suffer relegation - but despite this, the club pulled through and escaped the drop following the vote to end the season, giving hope the O's would build on the success of Edinburgh's promotion.

Because of Bury's demise, only one club was relegated from the Football League this season (the League Two clubs initially voted for no movement between the Football League and National League to take place this season, but this plan was subsequently vetoed by the Football Association). Ultimately, Stevenage finished bottom and appeared set to return to the National League after a decade, following a dismal season in which they had four different managers, and fell to the foot of the table in late September and never left it. However, Macclesfield Town lost a total of seventeen points for various financial transgressions during the course of the season; the last four of those deducted points were initially suspended until the following season, but an appeal by the Football League and Stevenage saw them instead applied to this season, causing Macclesfield to instead finish bottom and return to the National League after just two years; they would ultimately never take their place in that league, however, as their financial problems proved insurmountable, resulting in the club folding a few weeks into the 2020–21 season, and thus making this the final season that they completed. The combination of Bury's demise and Macclesfield's points deductions saved Morecambe, who were statistically the second-worst team after Stevenage, from relegation to the National League.

National League Top Division 

As with League One and League Two, the National League curtailed its season, with the final placings decided on points-per-game. Barrow therefore finished top and returned to the Football League for the first time since 1972; the longest gap that any team has had between leaving the Football League (either via automatic relegation or the prior election system) and re-entering it via automatic promotion. Harrogate Town, who were in second place prior to the suspension of the season, won the play-offs and entered the Football League for the first time in their history.

Chorley finished in last place after a dismal season, in which they were on the verge of relegation even before the season's suspension cemented this outcome. AFC Fylde's fortunes declined sharply after two consecutive play-off finishes, and they were left to rue a poor run of results which dumped them into the relegation spots and ultimately sealed their fate when the season was suspended. Ebbsfleet United, who like Fylde enjoyed two strong finishes in the previous season, filled the final relegation spot; they had actually been outside the relegation zone prior to the season's suspension, but dropped into it on points-per-game in place of Maidenhead United. Maidenhead would themselves have been relegated, if not for Bury's demise meaning they ended up being reprieved.

League play-offs

Football League play-offs

EFL Championship

Final

EFL League One

Final

EFL League Two

Final

National League play-offs

National League

Final

National League North

Final

National League South

Final

Cup competitions

FA Cup

Final

EFL Cup

Final

Community Shield

EFL Trophy

Final

FA Trophy 

The final was rescheduled for 27 September 2020 however this was postponed as the FA hoped to have spectators in the final. The date was then agreed for 3 May 2021 behind closed doors as a suitable solution could not be reached to be played with fans.

Final

Women's football

FA Women's Super League

FA Women's Championship

FA Women's National League

Northern Division

Southern Division

Division One North

Division One Midlands

Division One South East

Division One South West

Cup competitions

FA Women's Cup

Final

The final was played at Wembley Stadium on Saturday 1 November 2020.

FA Women's League Cup

Final

Managerial changes 
This is a list of changes of managers within English league football:

Deaths
 1 June 2019: José Antonio Reyes, 35, Spain and Arsenal winger.
 4 June 2019: George Darwin, 87, Huddersfield Town, Mansfield Town, Derby County, Rotherham United and Barrow inside forward.
 4 June 2019: Lawrie Leslie, 84, Scotland, West Ham United, Stoke City, Millwall and Southend United goalkeeper.
 6 June 2019: Johnny Robinson, 83, Bury and Oldham Athletic winger.
 8 June 2019: Justin Edinburgh, 49, Southend United, Tottenham Hotspur and Portsmouth left back, who also managed Newport County, Gillingham and Northampton Town and was manager of Leyton Orient at the time of his death.
 13 June 2019: Geoff Lees, 85, Bradford City wing half.
 17 June 2019: Ian MacFarlane, 86, Chelsea and Leicester City full back, who also managed Carlisle United, Sunderland and Leicester City.
 c. 19 June 2019: Bobby Brown, 87, Workington full back.
 19 June 2019: Dennis White, 70, Hartlepool United full back.
 24 June 2019: Graham Barnett, 83, Port Vale, Tranmere Rovers and Halifax Town inside-forward.
 23 July 2019: Bobby Park, 73, Aston Villa, Wrexham, Peterborough United, Northampton Town and Hartlepool United wing half.
 24 July 2019: Sammy Chapman, 81, Mansfield Town and Portsmouth wing half, who also managed Wolverhampton Wanderers.
 24 July 2019: Bernard Evans, 82, Wrexham, Queens Park Rangers, Oxford United and Tranmere Rovers forward.
 28 July 2019: Peter McConnell, 82, Leeds United, Carlisle United and Bradford City wing half.
 28 July 2019: Kevin Stonehouse, 59, Blackburn Rovers, Huddersfield Town, Blackpool, Darlington and Rochdale striker.
 30 July 2019: Ron Hughes, 88, Chester full back.
 1 August 2019: Steve Talboys, 52, Wimbledon and Watford midfielder.
 5 August 2019: John Lowey, 61, Sheffield Wednesday, Blackburn Rovers, Wigan Athletic, Preston North End and Chester City midfielder.
 11 August 2019: Doug Clarke, 85, Hull City, Torquay United and Bury winger.
 c. 16 August 2019: Bobby Smith, 78, Barnsley full back/midfielder.
 22 August 2019: Junior Agogo, 40, Ghana, Sheffield Wednesday, Queens Park Rangers, Bristol Rovers and Nottingham Forest striker.
 4 September 2019: Kenny Mitchell, 62, Newcastle United and Darlington defender.
 13 September 2019: Dennis Edwards, 82, Charlton Athletic, Portsmouth and Aldershot inside forward.
 18 September 2019: Kelvin Maynard, 32, Burton Albion right back.
 26 September 2019: Peter Downsborough, 76, Halifax Town, Swindon Town and Bradford City goalkeeper.
 1 October 2019: Fred Molyneux, 75, Southport, Plymouth Argyle and Tranmere Rovers defender.
 10 October 2019: Stuart Taylor, 72, Bristol Rovers central defender and record league appearance holder.
 23 October 2019: Duncan Forbes, 78, Colchester United and Norwich City central defender.
 28 October 2019: Bert Mozley, 96, England and Derby County right back.
 9 November 2019: Cyril Robinson, 90, Blackpool, Bradford Park Avenue and Southport wing half.
 10 November 2019: Les Campbell, 84, Preston North End, Blackpool and Tranmere Rovers winger.
 10 November 2019: Dennis Sorrell, 79, Leyton Orient and Chelsea left half.
 16 November 2019: Johnny Wheeler, 91, England, Tranmere Rovers, Bolton Wanderers and Liverpool wing half.
 23 November 2019: Sean Haslegrave, 68, Stoke City, Nottingham Forest, Preston North End, Crewe Alexandra, York City and Torquay United midfielder.
 25 November 2019: Martin Harvey, 78, Northern Ireland and Sunderland wing half.
 6 December 2019: Brian Sparrow, 57, Arsenal and Crystal Palace full back.
 7 December 2019: Ron Saunders, 87, Everton, Gillingham, Portsmouth, Watford and Charlton Athletic striker, who also managed Oxford United, Norwich City, Manchester City, Aston Villa, Birmingham City and West Bromwich Albion.
 9 December 2019: Roy Cheetham, 79, Manchester City and Chester winger.
 10 December 2019: Jim Smith, 79, Aldershot, Halifax Town, Lincoln City and Colchester United wing half, who managed Colchester, Blackburn Rovers, Birmingham City, Oxford United, Queens Park Rangers, Newcastle United, Portsmouth and Derby County.
 15 December 2019: Alan Jarvis, 76, Wales, Hull City and Mansfield Town forward.
 16 December 2019: Rod Johnson, 74, Leeds United, Doncaster Rovers, Rotherham United and Bradford City midfielder.
 18 December 2019: Tom White, 80, Crystal Palace, Blackpool, Bury and Crewe Alexandra forward.
 20 December 2019: Billy Hughes, 70, Scotland, Sunderland, Derby County and Leicester City forward.
 21 December 2019: Martin Peters MBE, 76, England World Cup winner, who played as a midfielder for West Ham United, Tottenham Hotspur, Norwich City and Sheffield United, the latter club whom he also managed.
 22 December 2019: Gary Talbot, 82, Chester and Crewe Alexandra striker.
 23 December 2019: Alan Harrington, 86, Wales and Cardiff City defender.
 23 December 2019: George Petchey, 88, West Ham United, Queens Park Rangers and Crystal Palace wing half, who also managed Leyton Orient and Millwall.
 25 December 2019: Martyn King, 82, Colchester United and Wrexham forward, who holds the record as the highest league goalscorer in Colchester United history.
 29 December 2019: John Shuker, 77, Oxford United defender.
 c. 30 December 2019: Micky Block, 79, Chelsea, Brentford and Watford winger.
 1 January 2020: Chris Barker, 39, Barnsley, Cardiff City, Queens Park Rangers, Plymouth Argyle and Southend United defender.
 6 January 2020: Ray Byrom, 85, Accrington Stanley and Bradford (Park Avenue) outside left.
 9 January 2020: Jimmy Shields, 88, Northern Ireland, Southampton and Headington United forward.
 10 January 2020: Eric Brookes, 75, Barnsley, Northampton Town and Peterborough United left back.
 12 January 2020: Brian Clifton, 85, Southampton and Grimsby Town inside forward/half back.
 20 January 2020: Mick Vinter, 65, Notts County, Wrexham, Oxford United, Mansfield Town and Newport County forward.
 23 January 2020: Tom Daley, 86, Grimsby Town, Huddersfield Town and Peterborough United goalkeeper.
 25 January 2020: Jordan Sinnott, 25, contracted to Alfreton Town at the time of his death, the midfielder had Football League experience with Huddersfield Town, Bury and Chesterfield.
 30 January 2020: Dale Jasper, 56, Chelsea, Brighton & Hove Albion and Crewe Alexandra defender/midfielder.
 c. 6 February 2020: Jimmy Moran, 84, Leicester City, Norwich City, Northampton Town, Darlington and Workington inside forward.
 7 February 2020: Brian Pilkington, 86, England, Burnley, Bolton Wanderers and Bury winger.
 9 February 2020: Peter McCall, 83, Bristol City and Oldham Athletic wing half.
 14 February 2020: Jimmy Conway, 73, Republic of Ireland, Fulham and Manchester City midfielder.
 14 February 2020: Brian Jackson, 86, Leyton Orient, Liverpool, Port Vale, Peterborough United and Lincoln City outside right.
 16 February 2020: Harry Gregg, OBE, 87, Northern Ireland, Doncaster Rovers, Manchester United and Stoke City goalkeeper, who also managed Shrewsbury Town, Swansea City, Crewe Alexandra and Carlisle United. He also survived the Munich air disaster in 1958, helping many of his fellow passengers to safety.
 20 February 2020: Malcolm Pyke, 81, West Ham United and Crystal Palace wing half.
 20 February 2020: Jimmy Wheeler, 86, Reading striker, who also managed Bradford City.
 15 March 2020: Mick Morris, 77, Oxford United and Port Vale forward.
 19 March 2020: Peter Whittingham, 35, Aston Villa, Cardiff City and Blackburn Rovers midfielder.
 26 March 2020: Fred Smith, 77, Burnley, Portsmouth and Halifax Town full back.
 30 March 2020: Alex Forsyth, 91, Darlington outside right.
 30 March 2020: John Haselden, 76, Rotherham United and Doncaster Rovers centre half, who also managed Huddersfield Town and coached numerous clubs.
 31 March 2020: Arthur Marsh, 72, Bolton Wanderers, Rochdale and Darlington defender.
 6 April 2020: Radomir Antić, 71, Yugoslavia and Luton Town defender.
 6 April 2020: Ray Hiron, 76, Portsmouth and Reading forward.
 12 April 2020: Peter Bonetti, 78, England and Chelsea goalkeeper.
 13 April 2020: David Corbett, 79, Swindon Town and Plymouth Argyle winger.
 13 April 2020: Peter Madden, 85, Rotherham United defender, who also managed Darlington and Rochdale.
 c. 13 April 2020: Alf Wood, 74, Manchester City, Shrewsbury Town, Millwall, Hull City, Middlesbrough and Walsall striker.
 14 April 2020: John Collins, 71, Tottenham Hotspur, Portsmouth, Halifax Town, Sheffield Wednesday and Barnsley full back.
 14 April 2020: Cyril Lawrence, 99, Rochdale and Wrexham winger.
 14 April 2020: Billy Wright, 89, Blackpool, Leicester City, Newcastle United, Plymouth Argyle and Millwall midfielder.
 14 April 2020: Ron Wylie, 86, Notts County, Aston Villa and Birmingham City midfielder, who also managed West Bromwich Albion.
 16 April 2020:  Peter Phoenix, 83, Oldham Athletic, Rochdale, Exeter City, Southport and Stockport County winger.
 17 April 2020: Norman Hunter, 76, England, Leeds United, Bristol City and Barnsley defender, who also managed Barnsley, Rotherham United and Bradford City.
 19 April 2020: Dickie Dowsett, 88, Tottenham Hotspur, Southend United, Southampton, Bournemouth & Boscombe Athletic and Crystal Palace inside forward.
 21 April 2020: Dave Bacuzzi, 79, Arsenal, Manchester City and Reading defender.
 22 April 2020: Sid Bishop, 86, Leyton Orient defender.
 22 April 2020: Jimmy Goodfellow, 76, Port Vale, Workington, Rotherham United and Stockport County midfielder, who coached a number of clubs and managed Cardiff City.
 24 April 2020: Don Woan, 92, Liverpool, Leyton Orient, Bradford City and Tranmere Rovers striker.
 c. 26 April 2020: John Rowlands, 73, Mansfield Town, Torquay United, Stockport County, Barrow, Workington, Crewe Alexandra and Hartlepool United forward.
 28 April 2020: Michael Robinson, 61, Republic of Ireland, Preston North End, Manchester City, Brighton & Hove Albion, Liverpool and Queens Park Rangers striker.
 29 April 2020: Trevor Cherry, 72, England, Huddersfield Town, Leeds United and Bradford City defender, who also managed Bradford City.
 29 April 2020: Allan Gauden, 75, Sunderland, Darlington, Grimsby Town, Hartlepool United and Gillingham midfielder.
 c. 29 April 2020: Jim Keers, 88, Darlington outside forward.
 2 May 2020: John Ogilvie, 91, Leicester City and Mansfield Town full back.
 3 May 2020: John Ridley, 68, Port Vale, Leicester City and Chesterfield midfielder.
 23 May 2020: Charlie Cooper, 79, Bolton Wanderers and Barrow defender.
 26 May 2020: Christian Mbulu, 23, Crewe Alexandra and Morecambe defender, he was under contract at Morecambe at the time of his death.
 26 May 2020: Glyn Pardoe, 73, Manchester City defender.
 28 May 2020: Paul Shrubb, 64, Fulham, Brentford and Aldershot utility player.
 30 May 2020: Ron Thompson, 88, Carlisle United wing half.
 5 June 2020: Jim Fryatt, 79, Charlton Athletic, Southend United, Bradford Park Avenue, Southport, Torquay United, Stockport County, Blackburn Rovers and Oldham Athletic striker.
 7 June 2020: Ralph Wright, 72, Bradford Park Avenue, Hartlepool United, Stockport County, Bolton Wanderers and Southport midfielder.
 8 June 2020: Tony Dunne, 78, Republic of Ireland, Manchester United and Bolton Wanderers left back.
 22 June 2020: Harry Penk, 85, Portsmouth, Plymouth Argyle and Southampton winger.
 23 June 2020: Dick Oxtoby, 80, Bolton Wanderers and Tranmere Rovers defender.
 26 June 2020: Theo Foley, 83, Republic of Ireland, Exeter City, Northampton Town and Charlton Athletic defender, who also managed Charlton Athletic and Northampton Town.

Retirements
 2 June 2019: Rudi Skácel, 39, former Czech Republic and Southampton midfielder.
 4 June 2019: Gary Taylor-Fletcher, 38, former Leyton Orient, Lincoln City, Huddersfield Town, Blackpool, Leicester City, Tranmere Rovers and Accrington Stanley forward.
 11 June 2019: Aaron Hughes, 39, former Northern Ireland, Newcastle United, Aston Villa, Fulham, Queens Park Rangers and Brighton & Hove Albion defender.
 12 June 2019: Tom Taiwo, 29, former Carlisle United midfielder.
 18 June 2019: Kris Boyd, 35, former Scotland and Middlesbrough striker.
 21 June 2019: Fernando Torres, 35, former Spain, Liverpool and Chelsea striker.
 28 June 2019: Stuart Lewis, 31, former Barnet, Gillingham, Dagenham & Redbridge and Wycombe Wanderers midfielder.
 4 July 2019: Dorus de Vries, 38, former Swansea City, Wolverhampton Wanderers and Nottingham Forest goalkeeper.
 4 July 2019: Arjen Robben, 35, former Netherlands and Chelsea winger.
 12 July 2019: Peter Crouch, 38, former England, Queens Park Rangers, Portsmouth, Aston Villa, Southampton, Liverpool, Tottenham Hotspur, Stoke City and Burnley striker.
 25 July 2019: Darren Bent, 35, former England, Ipswich Town, Charlton Athletic, Tottenham Hotspur, Sunderland, Aston Villa and Derby County striker.
 26 July 2019: Micah Richards, 31, former England, Great Britain, Manchester City and Aston Villa defender.
 26 July 2019: Marvin Sordell, 28, former Great Britain, Watford, Bolton Wanderers, Burnley, Colchester United, Coventry City and Burton Albion striker.
 29 July 2019: Patrice Evra, 38, former France, Manchester United and West Ham United left back.
 30 July 2019: Marcus Bean, 34, former Jamaica, Queens Park Rangers, Blackpool, Brentford, Colchester United and Wycombe Wanderers midfielder.
 3 August 2019: Leroy Lita, 34, former Bristol City, Reading, Middlesbrough, Swansea City, Barnsley and Yeovil Town striker.
 5 August 2019: Willo Flood, 34, former Manchester City, Cardiff City and Middlesbrough midfielder.
 5 August 2019: Karl Henry, 36, former Stoke City, Wolverhampton Wanderers, Queens Park Rangers, Bolton Wanderers and Bradford City midfielder.
 6 August 2019: David Forde, 39, former Republic of Ireland, Cardiff City, Millwall and Cambridge United goalkeeper.
 7 August 2019: Diego Forlán, 40, former Uruguay and Manchester United striker.
 12 August 2019: Michael Kightly, 33, former Southend United, Wolverhampton Wanderers, Stoke City and Burnley winger.
 20 August 2019: Jonathan Forte, 33, former Barbados, Sheffield United, Scunthorpe United, Southampton, Oldham Athletic, Notts County and Exeter City striker.
 24 August 2019: Shaun Wright-Phillips, 37, former England, Manchester City, Chelsea and Queens Park Rangers winger.
 27 August 2019: Jermaine Beckford, 35, former Jamaica, Leeds United, Everton, Leicester City, Bolton Wanderers, Preston North End and Bury striker.
 30 August 2019: David Meyler, 30, former Republic of Ireland, Sunderland, Hull City and Reading midfielder.
 6 September 2019: Andrew Taylor, 33, former Middlesbrough, Cardiff City, Wigan Athletic and Bolton Wanderers left back.
 7 September 2019: Samuel Eto'o, 38, former Cameroon, Chelsea and Everton striker.
15 September 2019: Daniel McBreen, 42, former Scunthorpe United and York City striker.
 19 September 2019: Dimitar Berbatov, 38, former Bulgaria, Tottenham Hotspur, Manchester United and Fulham striker.
 20 September 2019: Anderson, 31, former  Brazil and Manchester United midfielder.
 30 September 2019: Gareth McAuley, 39, former Northern Ireland, Lincoln City, Leicester City, Ipswich Town and West Bromwich Albion defender.
 3 October 2019: Greg Tansey, 30, former Stockport County and Stevenage midfielder.
 7 October 2019: Tim Howard, 40, former USA, Manchester United and Everton goalkeeper.
 8 October 2019: Bastian Schweinsteiger, 35, former Germany and Manchester United midfielder.
 16 October 2019: Calum Dyson, 23, former Everton and Plymouth Argyle striker.
 29 October 2019: James Morrison, 33, former Scotland, Middlesbrough and West Bromwich Albion midfielder.
 14 December 2019: Philippe Senderos, 34, former Switzerland, Arsenal, Fulham and Aston Villa centre half.
 31 December 2019: Sanmi Odelusi, 26, former Bolton Wanderers, Wigan Athletic, Colchester United and Cheltenham Town forward.
 24 January 2020: Dean Brill, 34, former Luton Town, Oldham Athletic, Barnet and Leyton Orient goalkeeper.
 29 January 2020: Billy Kee, 29, former Torquay United, Burton Albion, Scunthorpe United and Accrington Stanley striker.
 6 February 2020: Kenny Miller, 40, former Scotland, Wolverhampton Wanderers, Derby County and Cardiff City striker.
 19 February 2020: Alan Hutton, 35, former Scotland, Tottenham Hotspur and Aston Villa right back.
 22 April 2020: Lee Hughes, 43, former West Bromwich Albion, Notts County and Port Vale striker.
 22 April 2020: Yann Kermorgant, 38, former Leicester City, Charlton Athletic, A.F.C. Bournemouth and Reading striker.
 26 April 2020: Ricky Shakes, 35, former Trinidad & Tobago, Guyana, Swindon Town and Brentford winger.
 26 April 2020: Ted Smith, 24, former Southend United goalkeeper.
 26 May 2020: Alex Cisak, 31, former Tamworth, Accrington Stanley, Oldham Athletic, Portsmouth, Burnley, York City and Leyton Orient goalkeeper.
 1 June 2020: Brian Wilson, 37, former Stoke City, Cheltenham Town, Bristol City, Colchester United and Oldham Athletic defender.
 10 June 2020: Don Cowie, 37, former Scotland, Watford, Cardiff City and Wigan Athletic midfielder.
 10 June 2020: Gary Harkins, 35, former Grimsby Town midfielder.
 12 June 2020: Stephen Bywater, 39, former Rochdale, West Ham United, Derby County, Sheffield Wednesday, Millwall, Doncaster Rovers and Burton Albion goalkeeper.
 15 June 2020: Mark O'Brien, 27, former Derby County, Luton Town and Newport County defender.
 21 June 2020: David N'Gog, 31, former Liverpool, Bolton Wanderers and Swansea City striker.
 22 June 2020: Barry Roche, 38, former Nottingham Forest, Chesterfield and Morecambe goalkeeper.

Clubs removed
 Bury FC were expelled from the EFL League One on 27 August 2019, due to financial issues at the club meaning they could not satisfy the requirements of their notice of withdrawal issued by the EFL for this deadline date.

Diary of the season
 31 August 2019: The first month of the new season ends with Liverpool top of the Premier League, the only team to have won all 4 games in August. Manchester City are 2 points behind in second. Leicester City, Crystal Palace and West Ham United have made good starts to the season and occupy third to fifth, ahead of Arsenal (with a game in hand) and Manchester United. Newly promoted Aston Villa and Norwich City are having a tough time on their return to the top flight, tied on 3 points apiece with Wolverhampton Wanderers (who have played 9 games already en route to the Europa League group stage, and have a game in hand), and only above Watford, the only Premier League team without a win so far. Swansea City are having a good start under Steve Cooper's management to lead the Championship, 2 points ahead of newly promoted Charlton Athletic. Leeds United stand third and look to be contending for another attempt at promotion. West Bromwich Albion and Bristol City stand in fourth and fifth; newly relegated Fulham, Preston North End, Queens Park Rangers, and managerless Birmingham City tussle for the sixth play-off spot. Another newly relegated team, Huddersfield Town, are having a torrid start on their return to the second tier and stand in 23rd on 1 point, with manager Jan Siewert sacked a fortnight earlier. Stoke City prop up the table with 1 point also, 3 points behind 22nd-placed Wigan Athletic.
 30 September 2019: September ends with Liverpool now 5 points clear of second-placed Manchester City. Leicester and West Ham continue their good starts to the season and stand third and fifth, sandwiching Arsenal; Tottenham and Chelsea are sixth and seventh. Watford, still without a win, prop up the table, 3 points behind Aston Villa (18th) and Newcastle United. West Brom now lead the Championship, 1 point ahead of Swansea and Nottingham Forest and 2 ahead of Leeds, Preston, and Charlton. Wigan has climbed to 21st at the expense of Barnsley; the Championship relegation zone is otherwise unchanged.
 25 October 2019: Leicester break the record for the biggest away win in top-flight history with a 9–0 victory at Southampton.
 31 October 2019: Liverpool end October six points ahead of Manchester City, though they have lost their 100% record due to a 1–1 draw at Old Trafford. Leicester remain third, ahead of Chelsea on goal difference, largely thanks to that 9–0 victory over Southampton. Arsenal are 4 points adrift of the Champions League places in fifth, Crystal Palace's good start sees them sixth after 3 months played, and Manchester United, Sheffield United, Bournemouth, and West Ham share seventh with only goal difference separating them. Watford remain winless and bottom, now joined by Norwich and Southampton. West Brom continue to lead the Championship, two points ahead of Preston, Leeds, and Swansea. Sheffield Wednesday and Bristol City complete the top six. Barnsley (24th) and Stoke are joint bottom, joined in the Championship's bottom three by Middlesbrough.
 30 November 2019: Liverpool remain top of the league at the end of November, 11 points clear of Manchester City and Leicester (the latter of whom has a game in hand). Chelsea remain fourth. Spurs have jumped to fifth following Jose Mourinho's appointment, a point ahead of Wolves and two ahead of Sheffield United; however, the congested nature of the table below fourth is emphasised by the fact that the gap between Chelsea and Spurs (6 points) is the same as the gap between Spurs and 17th-placed Everton. The relegation zone remains unchanged from the end of October. Leeds lead the Championship, though second-placed West Brom have a game in hand. Fulham, Nottingham Forest, Bristol City and Preston make up the play-off zone. Barnsley and Stoke remain in the same places as last month, with Wigan replacing Middlesbrough in 22nd.
 31 December 2019: The new decade begins with Liverpool's lead extended to 16 points, Leicester and Manchester City swapping places, and Chelsea remaining fourth. Manchester United, Spurs, and Wolves are hot on the West London side's tails in the race for fourth. Watford have climbed off the bottom of the table at Norwich's expense, but remain in the bottom three, now joined by Aston Villa (18th). In the Championship, Leeds and West Brom hold a comfortable 9-point lead on Fulham, joined in the play-off places by Forest, Brentford, and Sheffield Wednesday. Stoke are now out of the drop zone on goal difference ahead of Barnsley and Luton, and Wigan a point behind.
 31 January 2020: Liverpool end January 19 points clear; it is increasingly a question of when, not if, the Merseysiders end their 30-year title drought. Manchester City have moved 3 points ahead of Leicester but the top 7 is otherwise unchanged from the end of December. Norwich and Watford remain 20th and 19th, but the relegation battle is heating up as only 2 goals separate West Ham (18th), Bournemouth and Watford, and Brighton and Villa only 2 points away from relegation. A difficult January has seen Leeds and West Brom's lead on third-placed Forest cut to 4 and 2 points respectively. Fulham are fourth, Brentford stay fifth, and Bristol City have taken sixth place from Sheffield Wednesday. Luton (24th) and Barnsley are 2 points behind 22nd-placed Wigan and 6 points from 21st-placed Charlton.
 29 February 2020: February ends with Watford ending Liverpool's unbeaten run; regardless, Liverpool are 22 points clear of Manchester City and need only 4 wins from 10 games to confirm the title. The only change to the top seven is with Sheffield United jumping above Wolves to seventh; however, the race for the Champions League is still far from decided as only 5 points separate Manchester United in fifth with Crystal Palace in 12th. The win over Liverpool has propelled Watford to 17th, above Bournemouth but below West Ham on goal difference. Villa are 2 points behind and Norwich 6 - it is not inconceivable that for only the second time in the Premier League's history, the final day could arrive with no team certain of the drop. With 10 games left in the Championship, West Brom and Leeds remain in the top 2, now 6 and 5 points away from third-placed Fulham. Forest (with a game in hand), Brentford and Preston complete the top 6. A run of 10 points from 6 games has seen Wigan rise to 19th, with Middlesbrough taking their place in the bottom three, although the Teessiders have a game in hand on their nearest rivals, Stoke (21st) and Charlton. Barnsley and Luton remain joint bottom.
13 March 2020: League Football is postponed for the foreseeable future due to the Coronavirus Pandemic, leaving Liverpool just shy of claiming their first top flight title in 29 years. Some National League and lower fixtures go ahead, but many choose not to play for the safety of fans, staff and players. It is unknown how long the league will be out of action or how long until all fixtures get postponed.
26 March 2020: The FA rule that every league below National League North/South, from Step 3 to Step 7, have been voided, and results expunged. No promotions or relegations will take place. The National League will meet to discuss the fate of the three remaining divisions.
25 June 2020: Manchester City lose 2–1 to Chelsea, therefore clinching the Premier League title for Liverpool with seven games to go. This also earns Liverpool the achievement of being the team that won the title earliest in terms of games played, with seven games remaining, and also the team to win it the latest, being the only team to win the title in June. A trophy presentation ceremony for the Reds will be held at Anfield after their game against Chelsea on the weekend of the 18th of July.

See also 
 2019–20 in English women's football

Notes

References 

 
2019 sport-related lists
2020 sport-related lists